KMAC (90.3 FM) was a radio station licensed to Antlers, Oklahoma, United States. The station was owned by Oklahoma Catholic Broadcasting, Inc.

KMAC broadcast a Catholic Religious format to the Antlers, Oklahoma, area.

History
This station was assigned call sign KMAC on November 14, 2012.

The Federal Communications Commission cancelled KMAC's license on June 2, 2021, for failure to file a license renewal application.

References

External links
okcr.org

MAC
Catholic radio stations
Radio stations established in 2013
2013 establishments in Oklahoma
Defunct radio stations in the United States
Radio stations disestablished in 2021
2021 disestablishments in Oklahoma
Defunct religious radio stations in the United States
MAC